Rossmania is a genus of fungi within the family Valsaceae.

References

External links

Diaporthales